Elachista cingillella is a moth of the family Elachistidae found in Europe.

Description
Adults have been recorded in May.

The larvae feed on upright brome (Bromus erectus), wood millet (Milium effusum) and Dichanthium ischaemum mining the leaves of their host plant. The mine has the form of a gradually widening gallery in the base of the blade. Pupation takes place outside of the mine. Larvae can be found from September to April and again from June to early August. Larvae of the first generation overwinter within the mine. They are dark olive green.

Distribution
It is found from Fennoscandia and Russia to the Pyrenees and Alps and from Great Britain to Romania.

References

cingillella
Leaf miners
Moths described in 1855
Moths of Europe
Taxa named by Gottlieb August Wilhelm Herrich-Schäffer